Chris Wingert (born June 16, 1982) is an American professional soccer player for New York Cosmos B in the National Premier Soccer League. He spent fourteen seasons of his professional career in Major League Soccer (MLS) with the Columbus Crew (2004–2005), Colorado Rapids (2006–2007), Real Salt Lake (2007–2014, 2016–2017) and New York City FC (2015–2016). He was a starting defender with Real Salt Lake's MLS Cup Championship team in 2009.

Career

College
Wingert attended St. John the Baptist Diocesan High School and played college soccer for St. John's University, where he was the 2003 Hermann Trophy winner as that year's best collegiate player.

During his college years Wingert also played with the Brooklyn Knights in the USL Premier Development League.

Professional

The Columbus Crew drafted Wingert in the second round (twelfth overall) in the 2004 MLS SuperDraft. Despite his collegiate success, MLS teams were skeptical about his ability to adapt to the faster and more physical professional game. Nevertheless, Wingert managed to earn a spot on a very good Crew team and was a versatile member of the squad for two years. While in Columbus, he played as both a defender and a defensive midfielder. On January 20, 2006, the Crew traded Wingert to Colorado Rapids for a fourth-round pick in the 2007 MLS SuperDraft.

On July 13, 2007, Real Salt Lake acquired Wingert from Colorado for a first-round pick in the 2008 MLS Supplemental Draft and a second-round pick in the 2009 supplemental draft.

After eight years with Salt Lake, Wingert was selected in the tenth round of the 2014 MLS Expansion Draft by expansion club New York City FC. The club also selected fellow Salt Lake teammate Ned Grabavoy.

Wingert was waived by New York City on January 30, 2016. Three days later, on February 2, he was claimed off of waivers by Real Salt Lake, starting his second stint with the club. He announced his retirement as a professional soccer player on February 19, 2018.

International
Wingert made his first international appearance for the United States against Sweden on January 24, 2009.

Personal
Wingert is the son of Norm Wingert who played for the Philadelphia Atoms in the North American Soccer League.

Honors

Real Salt Lake

Major League Soccer MLS Cup (1): 2009
Major League Soccer Eastern Conference Championship (1): 2009
Major League Soccer Western Conference Championship (1): 2013

References

External links
 
 

1982 births
Living people
American soccer players
St. John's Red Storm men's soccer players
Brooklyn Knights players
Columbus Crew players
Colorado Rapids players
Real Salt Lake players
New York City FC players
USL League Two players
Major League Soccer players
Soccer players from New York (state)
Columbus Crew draft picks
United States men's under-23 international soccer players
United States men's international soccer players
Association football defenders
Hermann Trophy men's winners
All-American men's college soccer players
St. John the Baptist Diocesan High School alumni